112th meridian may refer to:

112th meridian east, a line of longitude east of the Greenwich Meridian
112th meridian west, a line of longitude west of the Greenwich Meridian